Simpath is an algorithm introduced by Donald Knuth that constructs a zero-suppressed decision diagram (ZDD) representing all simple paths between two vertices in a given graph.

References

External links

 Graphillion library which implements the algorithm for manipulating large sets of paths and other structures.
 , A CWEB implementation by Donald Knuth.

Computer arithmetic algorithms
Donald Knuth
Graph algorithms
Mathematical logic
Theoretical computer science